Tangadee Station, often referred to as Tangadee, is a pastoral lease that operates as a cattle station.

Tangadee station was purchased in 1982 by Richard and Joan Day and is currently operated by son Barkley and grandsons Clayton and Ryan Day.

See also
List of ranches and stations

References

Pastoral leases in Western Australia
Stations (Australian agriculture)
Mid West (Western Australia)